Baipan Bhaari Deva is a 2023 Indian Marathi-language drama film directed by Kedar Shinde and produced by Jio Studios, MVB Media. It stars Rohini Hattangadi, Vandana Gupte, Sukanya Kulkarni in lead roles. The film was theatrically released on 6 January 2023.

Plot 
This film is the story of six sisters who are separated from each other due to some reason and also face family, personal and financial problems.

Cast 

 Rohini Hattangadi
 Vandana Gupte
 Sukanya Kulkarni 
 Shilpa Navalkar
 Deepa Parab
 Suchitra Bandekar

Production

Development 
After announcement of Godavari and Ghe Double Jio Studios announced on International Women's Day 'Baipan Bhaari Deva''' film. Madhuri Bhosale of MVB Media has produced the film in association with Bela Shinde and Ajit Bhure. 
 Casting 
The story of the film is about six sisters and women's centric hence, Shinde cast actresses Rohini Hattangadi, Vandana Gupte, Sukanya Mone, Suchitra Bandekar, Deepa Choudhary, Shilpa Navalkar in lead roles.

 Filming 
Principal photography was started before Lockdown in India, but the shooting was stopped due to the COVID-19 pandemic in Maharashtra. According to Kedar Shinde, 80% shooting of the film was completed before the lockdown. Post-production was completed after the lockdown.

 Release Baipan Bhaari Deva'' was theatrically released on 6 January 2023.

References

External links 

 

Upcoming Indian films
2023 films
2020s Marathi-language films
Unreleased Indian films
Indian drama films